Equizetum is a former city and bishopric in Roman North Africa which only remains a Latin Catholic titular see.

Its presumed location is Ouled-Agla (colonial French name Lacourbe) in present Algeria.

History 
It was among the cities of sufficient importance in the Roman province of Mauretania Sitifensis (in the papal sway) to become a suffragan diocese, but was to fade, plausibly at the seventh century advent of Islam.

Two of its bishops are historically documented:
 The schismatic Donatist Victor attended the Council of Carthage in 411, where the prevailing Catholic bishops declared his sect heretical.
 Pacatus, participant in the Council of Carthage called in 484 by Arian king Huneric of the Vandal Kingdom, after which ha was exiled like most catholic bishops.

Titular see 
The diocese was nominally restored in 1933 as Latin titular bishopric of Equizetum (Latin) / Equizeto (Curiate Italian) / Equizeten(sis) (Latin adjective).

It has had the following incumbents, so far of the fitting Episcopal (lowest) rank:
 Michael Rodrigues (1964.03.15 – death 1964.10.12) as emeritus; formerly Bishop of Belgaum (India) (1953.09.19 – retired 1964.03.15)
 Juan Tarsicio Senner, Friars Minor (O.F.M.) (born Austria) (1965.08.19 – resigned 1976.01.23) as emeritus, died 1985; formerly Titular Bishop of Rusadus (1942.02.25 – 1951.10.26) first as Apostolic Vicar of Chiquitos (Bolivia) (1942.02.25 – 1949) and then as Auxiliary Bishop of Archdiocese of Sucre (Bolivia) (1949 – 1951.10.26), next Bishop of Cochabamba (Bolivia) (1951.10.26 – retired 1965.08.19)
 Ronald Gerard Connors, Redemptorists (C.SS.R.) (1976.04.24 – 1977.07.20) as Coadjutor Bishop of San Juan de la Maguana (Dominican Republic) (1976.04.24 – 1977.07.20); next succeeded as Bishop of San Juan de la Maguana (1977.07.20 – retired 1991.02.20), died 2002
 José Vittorio Tommasí (1984.11.19 – 1991.08.28) as Auxiliary Bishop of Archdiocese of Bahía Blanca (Argentina) (1984.11.19 – 1991.08.28); next Bishop of Nueve de Julio (Argentina) (1991.08.28 – death 1998.09.16)
 Juan Bautista Herrada Armijo, Mercedarians (O. de M.) (1991.11.30 – death 2002.01.21) first as Apostolic Administrator of Territorial Prelature of Calama (Chile) (1976.02.26 – 1982.03.05), then as Bishop-Prelate of Calama (1982.03.05 – 1991.11.30), finally as Auxiliary Bishop of Archdiocese of Antofagasta (Chile) (1991.11.30 – 1997.07.16)
 Antonio Nova Rocha (2002.02.15 – 2010.11.13) as Auxiliary Bishop of Archdiocese of Barranquilla (Colombia) (2002.02.15 – 2010.11.13) and Apostolic Administrator of Barranquilla (2010.08 – 2010.11.13); later Bishop of Facatativá (Colombia) (2010.11.13 – death 2013.04.09)
 Santo Loku Pio Doggale (2010.11.27 – ) (born Sudan) as Auxiliary Bishop of Archdiocese of Juba (South Sudan) (2010.11.27 – ).

See also 
 List of Catholic dioceses in Algeria

References

Sources and external links 
 GCatholic 
 Bibliography
 Pius Bonifacius Gams, Series episcoporum Ecclesiae Catholicae, Leipzig 1931, p. 465
 Stefano Antonio Morcelli, Africa christiana, Volume I, Brescia 1816, pp. 155–156
 H. Jaubert, Anciens évêchés et ruines chrétiennes de la Numidie et de la Sitifienne, in Recueil des Notices et Mémoires de la Société archéologique de Constantine, vol. 46, 1913, pp. 116–117

Catholic titular sees in Africa
Suppressed Roman Catholic dioceses